Eutrecha is a monotypic genus of ammotrechid camel spiders, first described by Emilio Antonio Maury in 1982. Its single species, Eutrecha longirostris is distributed in Venezuela.

References 

Solifugae
Arachnid genera
Monotypic arachnid genera